Opis (Akkadian Upî or Upija) was an ancient Babylonian city near the Tigris, not far from modern Baghdad. Akkadian and Greek texts indicate that it was located on the east side of the Tigris, near the Diyala River.
 

The precise site of the city has been uncertain for a long time, though at one point thought to be near or under the city of Seleucia.

History

Opis is mentioned for the first time at the beginning of second millennium BC. In the 14th century BC, it became the capital of an administrative region in Babylonia.

The Babylonians dug the "royal canal" between the Euphrates and the Tigris, which ended near Opis. The Babylonian king Nebuchadnezzar II (605–562 BC) built a long wall between the two rivers to protect against a potential Median invasion; the fortified line continued eastward beyond the Tigris and ended near Opis.

Persian Conquest

In October 539 BC, the troops of the Babylonian king Nabonidus (556–539 BC) defended Opis against the Persians commanded by Cyrus the Great (559–530 BC). The Babylonians were defeated and the native population revolted against its government. Without further fighting, Cyrus captured Babylon. Opis was located near the Persian Royal Road, which connected the former Elamite capital Susa to the Assyrian heartland around Erbil and, further to the west, the Lydian capital Sardis.

Macedonian Conquest

In September 331 BC, the Macedonian king Alexander the Great (336–323 BC) defeated Darius III of Persia (336–330 BC) at the Battle of Gaugamela, and probably took possession of Opis about the same time as Babylon. A few years later, Alexander was forced by a mutiny at the Hyphasis (now Beas) River to return from the long campaign in India, and his European troops revolted again at Opis (autumn 324 BC). In an attempt to craft a lasting harmony between his Macedonian and Persian subjects, he took an oath of unity before 9,000 Persian and Greek troops at Opis.  In a similar vein, he had married Stateira (the daughter of Darius) and celebrated a mass marriage of his senior officers to Persian and other Eastern noblewomen at Susa just before coming to Opis.

Hellenic Rule

The Hellenistic city of Seleukeia rapidly eclipsed older Mesopotamian centers in the region like Babylon, Sippar, and Opis.

In the 2nd century BC, the Parthian Empire conquered the eastern provinces of the Seleucid Empire, including Seleukeia and Opis. Both cities were, in their turn, largely eclipsed by the emergence of the new Parthian (and subsequently Persian) capital Ktesiphon nearby, in-between Seleukeia and Opis.

References

Bibliography
 Ross, J., “A Journey from Baghdad to the Ruins of Opis and the Median Wall”, in Journal of the Royal Geographical Society, vol. 11, pp. 121–136, 1841
 P. Högelmann and K. Buschmann, "Östlicher Mittelmeerraum. Das achämenidische Westreich von Kyros bis Xerxes (547–479/8 v. Chr.)," in Tübinger Atlas des Vorderen Orients, B IV 23, 1986.
 A. T. Olmstead, History of the Persian Empire, Chicago 1948.
 S. Parpola and M. Porter, The Helsinki Atlas of the Near East in the Neo-Assyrian Period, Helsinki 2001.
 R. J. Talbert, Barrington Atlas of the Greek and Roman World, Princeton 2000.

External links
 Alexander the Great: the mutiny at Opis.

Babylonia
Twin cities
Former populated places in Iraq